"No Complaints" is the debut solo single by American record producer Metro Boomin featuring American rapper Offset of Migos and Canadian rapper Drake. The song was featured as a bonus track on Metro's debut solo studio album, Not All Heroes Wear Capes (2018). The song was released as a digital download on June 23, 2017, by Boominati Worldwide and Republic Records.

Commercial performance
The song entered at number 71 on the US Billboard Hot 100.

Charts

Weekly charts

Year-end charts

Certifications

Release history

References

2017 debut singles
2017 songs
Metro Boomin songs
Offset (rapper) songs
Drake (musician) songs
Republic Records singles
Song recordings produced by Metro Boomin
Songs written by Metro Boomin
Songs written by Offset (rapper)
Songs written by Drake (musician)